Two ships of the Royal Navy have borne the name HMS Chesapeake

Broken up in 1819
  was a 51-gun screw-propelled frigate launched in 1855 and broken up in 1867

References

Royal Navy ship names